This is a list of 310 species in the genus Liris.

Liris species

References